Stelis louisae  is a bee in the genus Stelis.  It was described by Theodore Dru Alison Cockerell in 1911. Synonyms include Stelis floridana. It lives in the eastern United States, sometimes on Helianthus, and is active from March to September.

References

Megachilidae
Hymenoptera of North America
Insects of the United States

Insects described in 1911